Max Bernstein (May 12, 1854, Fürth – March 5, 1925, München) was a German art and theatre critic and author. He was the husband of Elsa Bernstein.

The Salon Bernstein 
Bernstein and his wife Elsa had one of the most prominent salons during the millennium. Guests included Theodor Fontane, Henrik Ibsen, Paul Heyse, Gerhart Hauptmann, Hermann Levi, Thomas Mann, Gustav Mahler, Ludwig Ganghofer, Ludwig Thoma, Frank Wedekind, Hugo von Hofmannsthal, Rainer Maria Rilke, Max Halbe, Hermann Sudermann, Otto Brahm, Ricarda Huch, Eduard von Keyserling, Georg Hirth, Erich Mühsam, Klabund, Franziska zu Reventlow, Annette Kolb, Tilla Durieux, Richard Strauss, Engelbert Humperdinck, Bruno Walter, Franz von Stuck, Olaf Gulbransson, Friedrich August von Kaulbach, Maximilian Harden, and Max Weber.

Works 
 Der kleine Hydriot (art critic, 1884)
 Münchener Bunte Mappe (anthology, 1884)
 Kleine Geschichten (stories, 1888)
 Münchener Jahresausstellung von Kunstwerken aller Nationen (1889)
 Blau (comedy, 1894)
 D’ Mali (play, 1903)
 Narrische Leut’ (stories, 1904)
 Herthas Hochzeit (comedy, 1907)
 Die Sünde (comedy, 1909)
 Der gute Vogel (comedy, 1913)
 Herrenrecht (play, 1916)
 Gesindel (play, 1921)
 Theaterbriefe (critiques in the Münchner Neueste Nachrichten)

References 
   Jürgen Joachimsthaler: Max Bernstein. Kritiker, Schriftsteller, Rechtsanwalt (1854-1925). 2 vols. Frankfurt/M. et al. 1995.

German art critics
People from Fürth
19th-century German Jews
1854 births
1925 deaths
German male dramatists and playwrights
19th-century German dramatists and playwrights
19th-century German male writers
19th-century German writers
20th-century German dramatists and playwrights
German male non-fiction writers